Nabeglavi (also Nabeghlavi) is a mineral water from Georgia.

Georgian-Swiss joint stock company “Healthy Water” produces famous mineral water “Nabeghlavi” and spring water “Bakhmaro.” The company was founded in 1997 and by now is a leader of the local mineral water market.

The new-found company's prime goal was to restore long time tradition of bottling Nabeghlavi mineral water and it was successfully gained. Thus, the story of establishing “Healthy Water” company leads back to the history of water Nabeghlavi.

Bottling of Nabeghlavi mineral water was initiated in 1958, following the establishment of a health resort in ecologically pure environment of village Nabeghlavi, which in turn was determined by revealing the water's unique curative properties. By that time water production output was small and the distribution area was rather limited.

Since JSC Healthy Water obtained license and took over the business, product quality and the output increased significantly and it became popular country-wide, gained appreciation of Georgian consumers and gradually a leading position on the market.

Product

The source of mineral water is located on the territory of health resort Nabeghlavi, in Western Georgia, hence the name of the water.

The source was discovered in 1905. According to an old story, local inhabitants of the region noticed that buffalos were especially attracted to one of the water sources; the very same source later turned out to have special taste and curative properties.

Fundamental exploration of the mineral water deposit was conducted during the first half of the 20th century by famous Georgian and foreign researchers.

Initial study of the chemical composition of the water was performed in 1921 by Latvian scientist Robert Kuptsis, who spent most of his life in Georgia. Later hydro-geological research was led by famous Georgian and foreign scientists during the 1930s.

Within this period, chemical properties of the water were scientifically developed and the water was stated to have bicarbonate calcium-sodium composition as well as carbon dioxide.

Attributes
Nabeghlavi water is formed at depth of 2000–3000 meters. The infiltrated waters travel through various layers of substrate and rocks, absorb specific combination of minerals and trace elements that define its unique taste and beneficial properties. Nabeghlavi water is naturally sparkling as it is infused with natural carbon dioxide at the aquifer; though it is fortified with additional amount of natural  prior to bottling.

Chemical composition
Total dissolved solids 3.5 – 5.9 g/l

Cations	mg/l
Ca2+	32-116
Mg2+	34-120
Na+ + K+	690-1270	
Anions	mg/l
HCO3-	2400-4400
Cl-	37-95
SO4 2-	53-244	
Specific components	mg/l
H2SiO3	55-90
H3BO3	> 35

Distribution
The product has been distributed in Georgia, Russia and Iran.

References

Bottled water brands
Mineral water in Georgia (country)
Carbonated water